Angoustrine-Villeneuve-des-Escaldes is a commune in the Pyrénées-Orientales department in southern France.

Geography

Localisation 
Angoustrine-Villeneuve-des-Escaldes is located in the canton of Les Pyrénées catalanes and in the arrondissement of Prades.

Government and politics

Mayors

Population

Sites of interest 
 Saint-André d'Angoustrine church, romanesque (12th c.).
 Saint-Martin d'Envalls chapel, romanesque.
 Saint-Assiscle et Sainte-Victoire de Villeneuve-des-Escaldes church, romanesque.
 The new Saint-André d'Angoustrine church, built in the 19th century.

See also

Communes of the Pyrénées-Orientales department

References

Communes of Pyrénées-Orientales